Raymond Trousson (June 11, 1936 – June 25, 2013) was a Belgian literary historian , professor emeritus at Free University of Brussels and member of the Royal Academy of French Language and Literature of Belgium. HIs interests were focused on the classical authors of the 18th century.

His biography of Rousseau is considered to be standard in French language.

Works
 Le thème de  Prométhée dans la littérature européene, 1964
 Un problème de littérature comparée: les études de thèmes, 1965.
 Socrate devant Voltaire, Diderot et Rousseau: la conscience en face du mythe, París, Lettres modernes, 1967
 Rousseau et sa fortune littéraire, Saint-Médard-en-Jalles, G. Ducros, 1971
 Voyages aux pays de nulle part. Histoire de la pensée utopique, Bruselas, ed. de l'Université, 1975. Tr.: Historia de la literatura utópica: viajes a países inexistentes, Edicions 62, 1995 ISBN 978-84-297-3940-4
 Le Thème de Prométhée dans la littérature européenne, Ginebra, Droz, 1976, 2 vols.
 Balzac disciple et juge de Jean-Jacques Rousseau, Ginebra, Droz; y París, 1983
 Le Tison et le flambeau: Victor Hugo devant Voltaire et Rousseau, Bruselas, ed. de l'Université, 1985
 Stendhal et Rousseau: continuité et ruptures, Colonia, DME, 1986
 Jean-Jacques Rousseau, París, Tallandier, 1988. Tr.: Jean Jacques Rousseau: gracia y desgracia de una conciencia, Alianza, 1995 ISBN 978-84-206-2805-9
 Charles De Coster ou La vie est un songe: biographie, Bruselas, éditions Labor, 1990
 Romans libertins du XVIII siècle, París, Robert Laffont, 1993
 Histoire de la libre pensée. Des origines à 1789, Bruselas, Espace de Libertés, col. "Laïcité", 1993, ISBN 2-930001-06-2. 
 Dictionnaire Voltaire (dir.), París, Hachette, 1994; y Bruselas, Espace de Libertés, coll. "Laïcité", 1994, ISBN 2-930001-13-5 
 Voltaire et les Droits de l'homme. Textes sur la justice et la tolérance (presentados y anotados), Espace de Libertés, col. "Laïcité", 1994, ISBN 2-930001-12-7. 
 Dictionnaire de Jean-Jacques Rousseau (dir.), París, Honoré  Champion, 1996.
 Romans de femmes du XVIII siècle: Mme. de Tencin, Mme. de Graffigny, Mme Riccoboni..., París, Robert Laffont, 1996.
 Images de Diderot en France, 1784-1913, París, Honoré Champion, 1997.
 D'Utopie et d'Utopistes, Paris-Montréal, L'Harmattan, 1998
 Dictionnaire de Diderot (dir.), París, Honoré Champion, 1999.
 Iwan Gilkin, poète de “La nuit”, Bruselas, éditions Labor, 1999.
 Visages de Voltaire: XVIII y XIX siècle, París, Honoré Champion, 2001.
 Religions d'utopie, Bruselas, Ousia, 2001
  Sciences, techniques et utopies. Du paradis à l'enfer, Paris, L'Harmattan, 2003.
 Antoine-Vincent Arnault (1766-1834): un homme de lettres entre classicisme et romantisme, París, Honoré Champion, 2004.
 Denis Diderot ou Le vrai Prométhée, París, Tallandier, 2005.
 Diderot jour après jour: chronologie, París, Honoré Champion, 2006.
 Denis Diderot, Gallimard, 2007.
 Voltaire, Tallandier, 2008.
 Charles De Coster, journaliste à l'Uylenspiegel, Bruselas, Espace de Libertés, col. "Laïcité", 2007, ISBN 2-930001-76-3

References

1936 births
2013 deaths
Belgian literary historians
Academic staff of the Université libre de Bruxelles